The name Becky has been used for five tropical cyclones in the Atlantic Ocean, two in the Northwest Pacific Ocean, one in the Australian region, and one in the South Pacific Ocean.

Atlantic Ocean
 Tropical Storm Becky (1958), no landfall
 Tropical Storm Becky (1962), brought about 30 hours of rainfall on the Cape Verde islands
 Hurricane Becky (1966), no landfall
 Tropical Storm Becky (1970), landfall on the Florida Panhandle
 Hurricane Becky (1974), formed southwest of Bermuda, no landfall

Northwest Pacific Ocean
 Typhoon Becky (1990) (16W, Iliang), hit northern Luzon as a strong tropical storm; strengthened over the South China Sea and hit northern Vietnam as a category 1 typhoon
 Typhoon Becky (1993) (22W, Yeyeng), brushed the northern end of Luzon; landfall in China

Australian
 Cyclone Becky (1968)

South Pacific
 Tropical Cyclone Becky (2007) (13F, 21P), threatened Vanuatu but did not make landfall

Atlantic hurricane set index articles
Pacific typhoon set index articles
Australian region cyclone set index articles